The 1928 Delaware gubernatorial election was held on November 6, 1928. Republican Governor Robert P. Robinson declined to seek a second term. C. Douglass Buck, the Chief Engineer of the State Highway Department, was seen as the likely frontrunner heading into the Republican convention. At the convention, Buck's primary opponent was State Senator I. Dolphus Short, whom he defeated by a wide margin, receiving 104 votes to Short's 54.

On the Democratic side, former State Senator Charles Wharton, a well-known football player for on the Penn Quakers team at the University of Pennsylvania, emerged as the frontrunner. Wharton was seen as a strong candidate by the Democratic establishment and won the nomination unopposed. 

However, despite Wharton's reputation and his strength as a candidate, he proved little obstacle to Buck. Republican presidential nominee Herbert Hoover won the state in a record-breaking landslide, and helped Buck across the finish line. Though Buck underperformed Hoover, he still won handily, winning 61% of the vote to Wharton's 39%.

General election

References

Bibliography
 

1928
Delaware
Gubernatorial
November 1928 events